The year 2012 was the inaugural year for Super Fight League, an Indian-based mixed martial arts (MMA) league.  Its first event was held in March and featured a bout between the two MMA veterans Bob Sapp and James Thompson.  The league has scheduled several events to occur throughout India in 2012. On 5 August 2012, the Super Fight League aired their reality show SFL Challengers. Similar to the Ultimate Fighter, the show took young up-and-coming Indian mixed martial artists, placing them in the same house. On October 12, the Super Fight League changed their organisational structure from one event a month in arenas to one event every Friday in a specially designed mini-arena in Mumbai in front of an exclusive invitation only audience. With programming lasting for three hours each week with weigh-ins, live fights, and interviews from Bollywood cage side guests. There was seven fights in total each event, with one of them being a female bout. It aired live on Neo Prime in India and on their YouTube page for the rest of the world.

List of events

Event summaries

Super Fight League 1
Super Fight League 1 was held on March 11, 2012 at the Andheri Sports Complex in Mumbai, India and was the first ever event promoted by Super Fight League.  Prior to the event, Bollywood stars, including Bipasha Basu, provided 45 minutes of live entertainment.  Jennifer Lopez and electropop group LMFAO were invited to perform at the event as well.  The event was streamed live on YouTube.

The main event featured a heavyweight fight between Bob Sapp and James Thompson.  Both fighters are veterans of Pride Fighting Championships but had never faced each other before. Sapp went into the fight on a five-fight losing streak while Thompson had mixed results in his recent outings. As soon as the fight was started, Thompson headed straight for Sapp and took him down within the first thirty seconds of the bout. After some ground and pound and grappling which had both fights on top of the other at some point, Thompson was able to twist Sapp's leg. Sapp tapped out at 1:52 of the first round due to the resulting leg injury.

Results

Super Fight League 2
Super Fight League 2 took place on April 7, 2012 at the T-Box Mobile Arena in Chandigarh, India.  As with Super Fight League 1 it was streamed live on YouTube.

A lightweight bout between Paul Kelly and Gabe Ruediger was initially scheduled. It would have fulfilled a pairing that had been planned for UFC 123. At the time, Ruediger was injured and was replaced by TJ O'Brien.  Kelly defeated O'Brien but was released from the UFC after a subsequent loss to Donald Cerrone.  Following a knockout loss to Scott Catlin on March 16, 2012, the California State Athletic Commission (CSAC) medically suspended Ruediger.  Although Super Fight League wasn't required to follow the CSAC's suspensions, they still decided to remove Ruediger from the fight card.  He was replaced with Ryan Healy.

The main event saw Todd Duffee facing Neil Grove.  Duffee's last fight was almost a year and a half prior when he lost a match to Alistair Overeem for the vacant Dream Heavyweight Championship.  Grove's most recent bouts were with Bellator Fighting Championships where he won three fights and lost three fights.  This was the first time the two fighters faced each other.  The fight ended 34 seconds into the first round when Duffee earned a technical knockout victory over Neil Grove.

Results

Super Fight League 3
Super Fight League 3 took place on May 6, 2012 at the Indira Gandhi Indoor Stadium in New Delhi, India. As with the previous events, it was streamed live on YouTube.

The main event was a heavyweight bout between Bobby Lashley and James Thompson. Lashley was coming into his Super Fight League debut on a two-fight winning streak, which included recently winning the Shark Fights Heavyweight title, whilst Thompson has gone 3-0(1) in his last 4 fights, which included his submission victory against Bob Sapp at Super Fight League 1.

The first round started off with Lashley using his wrestling skills to pressure Thompson. After a couple of knees in the clinch, Thompson accidentally caught Lashley in the groin, in which Lashley took a few minutes to recover from. The round ended with Lashley landing a barrage of punches to Thompson by the side of the cage. The second had both men landing some big punches next to the cage. Bobby shook his opponent a few times with clean strikes, but it was Thompson who won the round by clinching Lashley onto the cage and doing some dirty boxing. Lashley took another accidental low blow in the third, this time, Thompson was given a warning. Once recovered, Lashley came forward and both men continued to strike again. Thompson again kept the fight on the side of the cage with him landing punches from the clinch which arguably gave him the decision victory.

Fight Card

Super Fight League 4
Super Fight League 4 took place on October 12, 2012 in Mumbai, India. As with the previous events, it streamed live on YouTube and Neo Prime in India as well as being shown on the Fight Network in Canada for the first time. This event was originally meant to take place on September 29 at Bangalore and to be headlined by Todd Duffee and Jeff Monson, but due to changes to the structure of the Super Fight League events this fight will not take place at this event.  This marked the first event that the Super Fight League began showing weekly events.

Results

Super Fight League 5
Super Fight League 5 took place on October 19, 2012 in Mumbai, India. As with the previous events, it streamed live on YouTube and was shown on Neo Prime in India and on the Fight Network in Canada.

Results

Super Fight League 6
Super Fight League 6 took place on October 26, 2012 in Mumbai, India. As with the previous events, it streamed live on YouTube and was shown on Neo Prime in India and on the Fight Network in Canada.

Results

Super Fight League 7
Super Fight League 7 took place on November 2, 2012 in Mumbai, India. As with the previous events, it streamed live on YouTube and was shown on Neo Prime in India and on the Fight Network in Canada.

Results

Sources

Super Fight League 8
Super Fight League 8 took place on November 9, 2012 in Mumbai, India. As with the previous events, it streamed live on YouTube and was shown on Neo Prime in India and on the Fight Network in Canada.

Results

Sources

Super Fight League 9
Super Fight League 9 took place on November 16, 2012 in Mumbai, India. As with the previous events, it streamed live on YouTube and was shown on Neo Prime in India and on the Fight Network in Canada.

Results

Sources

Super Fight League 10
Super Fight League 10 took place on November 23, 2012 in Mumbai, India. As with the previous events, it streamed live on YouTube and was shown on Neo Prime in India and on the Fight Network in Canada.

Results

Sources

Super Fight League 11
Super Fight League 11 took place on November 30, 2012 in Mumbai, India. As with the previous events, it streamed live on YouTube and was shown on Neo Prime in India and on the Fight Network in Canada.

Results

Sources

Super Fight League 12
Super Fight League 12 took place on December 7, 2012 in Mumbai, India. As with the previous events, it will stream live on YouTube and will be shown on Neo Prime in India and on the Fight Network in Canada.

Results

Sources

Super Fight League 13
Super Fight League 13: Night of Champions took place on December 14, 2012 in Mumbai, India. As with the previous events, it streamed live on YouTube and was shown on Neo Prime in India and on the Fight Network in Canada. The Super Fight League rewarded 4 titles in the men's Welterweight, Lightweight, Featherweight and Bantamweight divisions at this event.

Results

See also
 Super Fight League
 2012 in mixed martial arts events

References

External links
 Super Fight League official site

2012 in Indian sport
Mixed martial arts events